MS-245 is a tryptamine derivative used in scientific research. It acts as a selective 5-HT6 receptor antagonist with a Ki of 2.3 nM, and was derived through structure-activity relationship development of the selective 5-HT6 agonist EMDT. It has been used as a lead compound for further development of tryptamine-derived 5-HT6 antagonists. In animal studies it has been shown to boost the activity of, but not substitute for, both amphetamine and nicotine.

See also 
 EMDT

References 

5-HT6 antagonists
Tryptamines
Phenol ethers